The Medal "For the Liberation of Prague" was a World War II campaign medal of the Soviet Union established on June 9, 1945 by decree of the Presidium of the Supreme Soviet of the USSR to satisfy the petition of the People's Commissariat for Defence of the Soviet Union to adequately reward the participants of the battles for the liberation of the city of Prague from the armed forces of Nazi Germany.

Medal Statute 
The Medal "For the Liberation of Prague" was awarded to soldiers of the Red Army, Navy, and troops of the NKVD, direct participants of the heroic assault and liberation of the city of Prague as well as to the organizers and leaders of combat operations in the capture of this city. 

Award of the medal was made on behalf of the Presidium of the Supreme Soviet of the USSR on the basis of documents attesting to actual participation in the liberation of Prague.  Serving military personnel received the medal from their unit commander, retirees from military service received the medal from a regional, municipal or district military commissioner in the recipient's community.  

The Medal "For the Liberation of Prague" was worn on the left side of the chest and in the presence of other awards of the USSR, was located immediately after the Medal "For the Liberation of Warsaw".  If worn in the presence of Orders or medals of the Russian Federation, the latter have precedence.

Medal Description 
The Medal "For the Liberation of Prague" was a 32mm in diameter circular brass medal with a raised rim on the obverse.  On its obverse along the upper half of the medal's circumference, the relief inscription "FOR THE LIBERATION OF", beneath the inscription, in prominent letters, the relief inscription "PRAGUE".  At the bottom, a small relief five pointed star over a laurel wreath, over the wreath, a rising sun casting divergent rays upwards.  On the reverse the relief date in three rows "9 MAY 1945" over a relief plain five pointed star.  

The Medal "For the Liberation of Prague" was secured by a ring through the medal suspension loop to a standard Soviet pentagonal mount covered by a 24mm wide purple silk moiré ribbon with an 8mm wide blue central stripe.

Recipients (partial list) 
The individuals below were all recipients of the Medal "For the Liberation of Prague".

Marshal of Aviation Alexander Ivanovich Pokryshkin
Marshal of the Soviet Union Ivan Ignatyevich Yakubovsky
Czechoslovak General Ludvík Svoboda
Marshal of the Soviet Union Ivan Stepanovich Konev
Army General Ivan Yefimovich Petrov
Marshal of the Soviet Union Pavel Fyodorovich Batitsky
Marshal of the Soviet Union Semyon Konstantinovich Kurkotkin
Colonel General Pavel Alekseyevich Kurochkin
Colonel General Leonid Mikhaylovich Sandalov
Colonel General Aleksandr Ilich Rodimtsev

See also 
Awards and decorations of the Soviet Union
Prague Offensive
Prague

References

External links 
 Legal Library of the USSR

Soviet campaign medals
Military awards and decorations of the Soviet Union
Czechoslovakia–Soviet Union relations
Awards established in 1945
1945 establishments in the Soviet Union